Somali Yacht Club is a Ukrainian rock band from Lviv formed in 2010.

Biography
Forming as a jam band in 2010 in the city of Lviv, close to the Ukrainian border with Poland, Somali Yacht Club eventually evolved into a main band for the 3 members. Self-releasing their first EP, Sandsongs in 2011, they signed on to Bilocation Records to release their first LP, The Sun in 2014. Their sound has been favorably compared to the likes of Pelican, Tool, and Kyuss.

Members
Ihor Pryshliak– guitar, vocals
Artem Bemba – bass
Lesyk Mahula – drums

Discography

Albums
The Sun (2014, Bilocation Records, Robustfellow Productions)
The Sea (2018, Bilocation Records, Robustfellow Productions)
The Sun +1 (2018, Robustfellow Productions)
The Space (2022, Season of Mist)

EPs
Sandsongs (2011, self-released)
Desert Walls (2013, self-released)
Sun's Eyes (2015, self-released)

References

Musical groups established in 2010
Post-metal musical groups
Ukrainian stoner rock musical groups
Psychedelic rock music groups
Ukrainian rock music groups
Ukrainian heavy metal musical groups
Musical groups from Lviv
2010 establishments in Ukraine